James Michael Carney (4 December 1891 – 1980) was an English footballer who played in the Football League for Glossop North End, Stalybridge Celtic and Newport County.

References

1891 births
1980 deaths
English footballers
Association football wing halves
Bolton Wanderers F.C. players
Blackpool F.C. players
Glossop North End A.F.C. players
Stalybridge Celtic F.C. players
Newport County A.F.C. players
English Football League players